Rig Deraz (also Romanized as Rīg Derāz) is a village in Cheraghabad Rural District, Tukahur District, Minab County, Hormozgan Province, Iran. At the 2006 census, its population was 786, in 166 families.

References 

Populated places in Minab County